"Bolivia" is a jazz standard written by American jazz pianist Cedar Walton. It is regarded as his best-known composition.

Background 
Bolivia was first recorded on Eastern Rebellion's self-titled album released in 1976 with Cedar Walton on piano, George Coleman on tenor saxophone, Sam Jones on bass, and Billy Higgins on drums.

Musical composition 

Bolivia is composed in G major and typically played in an Afro-Cuban style. 

The song contains a bass ostinato that is repeated throughout the first 16 bars of the song. The first 16 bars are entirely based upon a G7(13) chord.

The B section—or the final 16 bars—contains the following form. After the B-section, the song repeats with the same bass ostinato.

Notable recordings 

 Eastern Rebellion in Eastern Rebellion (1976)
 Sam Jones in Something in Common (1978)
 Doug Raney Quintet in I'll Close My Eyes (1982)
 Freddie Hubbard in Bolivia (1991)
 Cody Moffett in Evidence (1993)
 John Carlini in Further Adventures (2007)
 Sean Dobbins and the Modern Jazz Messengers in Blue Horizons (2008)

References 

1970s jazz standards
Jazz compositions

Jazz compositions in G major
Jazz standards